Benoki Dam is a combination of gravity and fill dam located in Okinawa prefecture in Japan. The dam is used for flood control, water supply and irrigation. The catchment area of the dam is 8.1 km2. The dam impounds about 50  ha of land when full and can store 4500 thousand cubic meters of water. The construction of the dam was started on 1975 and completed in 1987.

References

Dams in Okinawa Prefecture
1987 establishments in Japan